Chinese Taipei competed at the World Games 2017  in Wroclaw, Poland, from 20 July 2017 to 30 July 2017. "Chinese Taipei" is the designated name used by Taiwan to participate in some international organizations and almost all sporting events.

Competitors

Karate

Chinese Taipei has qualified at the 2017 World Games:

Women's -55 kg - 1 quota (Wen Tzu-yun)

She won the silver medal in her event.

Korfball
Chinese Taipei has qualified at the 2017 World Games in the Korfball Mixed Team event.

Tug of war 

Chinese Taipei won the gold medal in the women's indoor 540 kg event.

References 

T
2017 in Taiwanese sport
2017